is an electoral district in the Japanese House of Representatives. The district was established as a single-member constituency in 1994 from parts of the original 1st district.

Area Covered

Current District 
As of 5 January 2023, the areas covered by this district are as follows:

 Ōita (city) (Excluding the former towns of Saganoseki and Notsuharu)

Areas covered before 2013 
Before the 2013 redistricting, the area covered by the district were as follows:

 Ōita (city)

Elected Representatives

Election Results 
‡ - Also ran in the Kyushu PR district

‡‡ - Also ran and won a seat in the Kyushu PR district

References

Related 

Ōita (city)
Districts of the House of Representatives (Japan)
Districts in Ōita Prefecture
Politics of Ōita Prefecture